Tașca is a commune in Neamț County, Western Moldavia, Romania. It is composed of four villages: Hamzoaia, Neagra, Tașca and Ticoș-Floarea.

References

External links

Communes in Neamț County
Localities in Western Moldavia